Lidia Korsakówna (born 17 January 1934, Baranowicze, Poland – died 6 August 2013, Konstancin-Jeziorna) was a Polish theater and film actress. Born in Baranowicze, Poland (present-day Belarus), Korsakówna died in Konstancin-Jeziorna at the age of 79.

Honors and awards
Cross of Merit (1970)
Order of Polonia Restituta (1979)
Zasłużony Działacz Kultury (1984)
Medal of the 40th Anniversary of People's Poland (1985)
Medal for Merit to Culture – Gloria Artis (2011)

References

1934 births
2013 deaths
People from Baranavichy
People from Nowogródek Voivodeship (1919–1939)
Polish film actresses
Polish stage actresses
Officers of the Order of Polonia Restituta
Recipients of the Gold Cross of Merit (Poland)
Recipients of the Silver Medal for Merit to Culture – Gloria Artis
20th-century Polish women
Recipient of the Meritorious Activist of Culture badge